Lada Classic may refer to:

Classic (snooker), a professional snooker formerly tournament held in Bournemouth
A series of medium-sized Lada-branded family cars built by Russian car manufacturer AvtoVAZ, based on the design of the Fiat 124:
VAZ-2101
VAZ-2102
VAZ-2103
VAZ-2106
Lada Riva